Tereza Fišerová (born 23 February 1998) is a Czech slalom canoeist who has competed at the international level since 2013.

She has won nine medals at the ICF Canoe Slalom World Championships with three golds (Mixed C2: 2019, C1 team: 2021, 2022), three silvers (C1: 2017, C1 team: 2015, 2018) and three bronzes (C1: 2018, C1 team: 2017, 2019). She also won 10 medals (2 golds, 4 silvers and 4 bronzes) at the European Championships.

Fišerová won the overall World Cup title in two classes. She won in C1 in 2021 and 2022 and in mixed C2 in 2018 together with Jakub Jáně.

Fišerová competed at the 2020 Summer Olympics in Tokyo, finishing 6th in the C1 event.

World Cup individual podiums

References

External links

 

1998 births
Living people
Czech female canoeists
Olympic canoeists of the Czech Republic
Canoeists at the 2020 Summer Olympics
Medalists at the ICF Canoe Slalom World Championships
People from Roudnice nad Labem
Sportspeople from the Ústí nad Labem Region